Boadi is a surname. Notable people with the surname include:

Akwasi Boadi (born 1962), Ghanaian entertainer also known as Akrobeto
Francis Boadi (born 1991), Ghanaian footballer
Anthony Bright Boadi-Mensah, Ghanaian politician
Emmanuel Gyimah-Boadi, Ghanaian political scientist